Kazuhiko Tabuchi (born 5 October 1936) is a Japanese épée, foil and sabre fencer. He competed at the 1960 and 1964 Summer Olympics.

References

External links
 

1936 births
Living people
Japanese male épée fencers
Olympic fencers of Japan
Fencers at the 1960 Summer Olympics
Fencers at the 1964 Summer Olympics
Japanese male foil fencers
Japanese male sabre fencers